Modimolle–Mookgophong Local Municipality is a local municipality of South Africa. It was established after the August 2016 local elections by the merging of Mookgophong and Modimolle local municipalities. The total population is 107 699 (Source: Statistics South Africa, Community Survey 2016)

Politics 

The municipal council consists of twenty-eight members elected by mixed-member proportional representation. Fourteen councillors are elected by first-past-the-post voting in nine wards, while the remaining fourteen are chosen from party lists so that the total number of party representatives is proportional to the number of votes received. 

The following table shows the results of the 2021 election.

References

Local municipalities of the Waterberg District Municipality